"Da Coconut Nut" is a song by Filipino National Artist Ryan Cayabyab originally popularized by the band Smokey Mountain in 1991.

Philippine Daily Inquirer editor Rito Asilo characterized the song as a "wackily irreverent novelty hit". In July 2017, footage of a performance of the song by the 75-member Baylor University School of Music Men's Choir from the United States in an Emirates Airlines plane cabin before passengers and flight crew was posted online and became popular.

Composition 
The song's lyrics describe the many uses of the different parts of a coconut tree. Cayabyab, in an interview with ABS-CBN, said that the song was composed in the novelty style as originally popularized by Yoyoy Villame, who at times the song was incorrectly attributed to. Khmer Times described the song as a "whimsical Filipino piece." When the song was performed during Barack Obama's visit to the Philippines, Rappler described the song as a "classic ditty". The song borrows some melody from Guy Lombardo's 1944 recording of It's Love-Love-Love.

Performance 
The song became part of the concert programs of choirs in United States after a deal in July 2008 allowed its publication in the choral arrangement in Randy Stenson's Santa Barbara Music Publishing of California catalogue and performed in the American Choral Directors National Convention. Stenson first heard the song performed by a Hawaiian choir.

Cayabyab claimed that the song became popular among American choirs ever since. In July 2017, when a video of the Baylor University School of Music Men's Choir performing the song before airline crew and passengers in Emirates Airlines' plane cabin became popular, the choir stated that it had actually been singing the song since 2010.

The song has also been licensed for use for promotions featuring the coconut-based Malibu rum.

BINI version

"Da Coconut Nut" was covered by Bini as the group's pre-debut single. It was released on November 20, 2020 as a digital single by Star Music. The single is intended to pay homage to Maestro Ryan Cayabyab, a Filipino musician and a National Artist.

Composition
Bini's version of this iconic novelty song was given a new flavor, upbeat, fun and light. It is a genre-bending Original Pilipino Music or P-pop infused with electronic music elements.

Credits and personnel
Credits adapted from the description of Bini's "Da Coconut Nut" music video:
Words and music by Ryan Cayabyab
Composed by Ryan Cayabyab
Arranged by VO3E, Otowave
Chorus by RAMINU, PIT300, KNOLL JAYEON
Digital Editing by Jaeyeon Kim, PIT300, KNOLL JAYEON
Mixed by Travis
Mastered by BigMac
Choreography by Moon Yeon Joo, Kwak Seong Chan

Production: Key Elements Creative Media
Director/Producer: Kring Kim
Production Manager: Dyrus Azekiel Almirol
Asst Production Manager: Stephanie Bendero
DOP: Edriel Garcia
2nd Camera Operator: Cedric De Sagun
Offline Editor: Nicko Flores, Dyrus Almirol
Online Editor: Nicko Flores
Colorist: Dyrus Almirol
DIT: Kianne Nicolas
Production Assistants: John Peter Amoyo, Lance Leo Clemente
Hair and Makeup: Crisrev Bautista
Shooting locations: Silvermoon Studio and KDR Studio

Use in popular culture
 On 23 November 2020, BINI introduced a dance challenge via TikTok app with the hashtag #DaCocoBINIdance.
 On 22 February 2021, the official music video of "Da Coconut Nut" have been played and introduced for the first time to the housemates of Pinoy Big Brother: Connect, as part of Big Brother’s weekly task called “PBB Connect’s” P-POP. The song have been played throughout the week and in the three episodes of that weekly task, the housemates danced to the tune along with the BINI and BGYO.
 On 6 June 2021, "Da Coconut Nut" is used as one of the Preliminary Round songs in the Philippines community game show Everybody, Sing!.
 On July 2017, the Baylor University School of Men's choir sung the version in Fly Emirates.

References 

Bini (group) songs
English-language Filipino songs
Songs about trees
1991 songs